St. Elizabeth's Church is a historic church in Denver, Colorado, United States.  It was built in 1898 and was added to the National Register of Historic Places in 1969.

The church was founded in 1878 by and for German-speaking Catholic families in Denver.

References

Gothic Revival church buildings in Colorado
Roman Catholic churches in Colorado
National Register of Historic Places in Denver
Churches on the National Register of Historic Places in Colorado
Churches completed in 1898
1898 establishments in Colorado